Torysa is a village and municipality in Sabinov District in the Prešov Region of north-eastern Slovakia.

History
In historical records the village was first mentioned in 1265.

Geography
The municipality lies at an altitude of 449 metres and covers an area of 10.566 km2. It has a population of about 1470 people.

External links
http://www.statistics.sk/mosmis/eng/run.html

Villages and municipalities in Sabinov District
Šariš